Acid fuchsin or fuchsine acid, (also called Acid Violet 19 and C.I. 42685) is an acidic magenta dye with the chemical formula C20H17N3Na2O9S3. It is a sodium sulfonate derivative of fuchsine. Acid fuchsin has wide use in histology, and is one of the dyes used in Masson's trichrome stain.  This method is commonly used to stain cytoplasm and nuclei of tissue sections in the histology laboratory in order to distinguish muscle from collagen.  The muscle stains red with the acid fuchsin, and the collagen is stained green or blue with Light Green SF yellowish or methyl blue. It can also be used to identify growing bacteria.

See also 
 New fuchsine
 Pararosanilin
 Verhoeff’s Stain
 Pollen grain staining (Alexander's stain)

References

Staining dyes
Triarylmethane dyes
Anilines
Benzenesulfonates